Ayumi Hamasaki Concert Tour 2000 Vol.1 is the first session DVD of the live tour of the Japanese singer Ayumi Hamasaki that was released on September 13, 2000.

The DVD has a multi-angle function to switch between backstage view and audience view.

Track listing
 WHATEVER                                                      
 Fly high
 Trauma
 And Then
 monochrome
 immature
 Trust
 Depend on you
 Showtime
 TO BE
 too late
 Boys & Girls

Encore
 vogue
 SEASONS
 Far away
 Who…

Ayumi Hamasaki video albums
2000 video albums
Live video albums
2000 live albums